The Poltava Governorate or Poltavshchyna was a gubernia (also called a province or government) in the historical Left-bank Ukraine region of the Russian Empire. It was officially created in 1802 from the disbanded Malorossiya Governorate, which was split between the Chernigov Governorate and Poltava Governorate with an administrative center of Poltava.

Administrative division
It was administered by 15  :

Gadyachsky Uyezd (Gadyach – Гадячъ) (Hadiach)
Zenkovsky Uyezd (Zenkov – Зеньковъ) (Zinkiv)
Zolotonoshsky Uyezd (Zolotonosha – Золотоноша)
Kobelyaksky Uyezd (Kobeliaky – Кобеляки)
Konstantinogradsky Uyezd (Konstantinograd – Константиноградъ) (modern Krasnohrad)
Kremenchugsky Uyezd (Kremenchug – Кременчугъ) (Kremenchuk)
Lokhvitsky Uyezd (Lokhvytsia – Лохвица) (Lokhvytsia)
Lubensky Uyezd (Lubny – Лубны)
Mirgorodsky Uyezd (Mirgorod – Миргородъ) (Myrhorod)
Pereyaslavsky Uyezd (Pereiaslav – Переяславъ)
Piryatinsky Uyezd (Pyriatyn – Пирятинъ) (Pyriatyn)
Poltavsky Uyezd (Poltava – Полтава)
Priluksky Uyezd (Pryluky – Прилуки) (Pryluky)
Romensky Uyezd (Romny – Ромны)
Khorolsky Uyezd (Khorol – Хороль)

Most of these ended up in the modern Poltava Oblast of Ukraine, although some: Zolotonosha, Krasnohrad, Pereiaslav and Romny are now part of Cherkasy, Kharkiv, Kyiv and Sumy Oblasts respectively.

The Poltava Governorate covered a total area of 49,365 km2, and had a population of 2,778,151 according to the 1897 Russian Empire census. It was bordering the following Russian Governorates: Chernigov Governorate and Kursk Governorate to the north, Kiev Governorate to the west, Kharkov Governorate to the east, Kherson Governorate and Yekaterinoslav Governorate to the south. In 1914, the population was 2,794,727. After the formation of the Ukrainian SSR, the territory was wholly included into the new Soviet Republic. Initially the governorate system was retained although variations included the Kremenchug Governorate which was temporarily formed on its territory (August 1920 – December 1922), and the passing of the Pereyaslav uezd to the Kiev Governorate.
However, on Third of June 1925 the guberniya was liquidated and replaced by five okrugs (which already were the uyezd subdivision as of seventh of March 1923): Kremenchutsky, Lubensky, Poltavsky, Prylutsky and Romensky (the rest two okrugs existed within the guberniya, Zolotonoshsky and Krasnohradsky, were also liquidated).

Principal cities

Russian Census of 1897, the cities of more than 10,000 people. In bold are the cities of over 50,000.

 Kremenchug – 63,007 (Jewish – 29,577, Ukrainian – 18,980, Russian – 12,130)
 Poltava – 53,703 (Ukrainian – 30,086, Russian – 11,035, Jewish – 10,690)
 Romny – 22,510 (Ukrainian – 13,856, Jewish – 6,341, Russian – 1,933)
 Priluki – 18,532 (Ukrainian – 11,850, Jewish – 5,719, Russian – 821)
 Pereyaslav – 14,614 (Ukrainian – 8,348, Jewish – 5,737, Russian – 468)
 Kobeliaki – 10,487 (Ukrainian – 7,708, Jewish – 2,115, Russian – 564)
 Zenkov – 10,443 (Ukrainian – 8,957, Jewish – 1,261, Russian – 187)
 Lubny – 10,097 (Ukrainian – 5,975, Jewish – 3,001, Russian – 960)
 Mirgorod – 10,037 (Ukrainian – 8,290, Jewish – 1,248, Russian – 427)

Language 
By the Imperial census of 1897, in bold are languages spoken by more people than the state language.

Religion 
By the Imperial census of 1897, the major religion in the region that was virtually the state religion was the Eastern Orthodox with some population following Judaism. Other religions in the governorate were much less common.

Notes

References

External links 
 Poltava Guberniya – Article in Brockhaus and Efron Encyclopedic Dictionary 
 Poltava Governorate – Historical coat of arms 
 Chernihiv gubernia – Article in the Encyclopedia of Ukraine

 
Governorates of the Russian Empire
Governorates of Ukraine
1802 establishments in the Russian Empire
1802 establishments in Ukraine
1925 disestablishments in Ukraine
History of Kyiv Oblast
History of Chernihiv Oblast
History of Poltava Oblast
History of Sumy Oblast
History of Kharkiv Oblast